Mtools is an open source collection of tools to allow a Unix operating system to manipulate files on an MS-DOS file system, typically a floppy disk or floppy disk image.

The mtools are part of the GNU Project and are released under the GNU General Public License (GPL-3.0-or-later).

Usage 
The following refers to mtools usage in floppy images. (Useful for virtual machines such as QEMU or VirtualBox.)

Copying a file to floppy image:
$ mcopy -i Disk.img file_source ::file_target

Copying a file from floppy image to the current directory:
$ mcopy -i Disk.img ::file_source file_target

Deleting all files in the disk image
$ mdel -i Disk.img ::*.*

The drive character : (colon) has a special meaning. It is used to access image files which are directly specified on the command line using the -i options.

See also 

 Disk image

References

External links 
 mtools official page on the GNU website
 Boot disk images for DOS DOS disk images

Free file managers
GNU Project software